Billy Deans may refer to:
 Billy Deans, Australian rules footballer
 Billy Deans (diver), wreck and technical diver

See also
William Dean (disambiguation)